Freadelpha crux-nigra is a species of beetle in the family Cerambycidae. It was described by Frederick William Hope in 1833.

References

Sternotomini
Beetles described in 1833